Ringstead may refer to:

Places
Ringstead, Dorset, England
West Ringstead, a deserted Mediaeval village
RAF Ringstead, a former radar station
Ringstead Bay
Ringstead Coral Bed, a geological formation
Ringstead, Norfolk, England
Ringstead Downs
Ringstead, Northamptonshire, England
Ringstead and Addington railway station

People
Alf Ringstead (1927–2000), former Sheffield United footballer
Thomas de Ringstead (died 1366), an English Dominican and Bishop of Bangor

See also
 Ringsted (disambiguation)
 Ringsteadia